The first Baltimore in naval service in the United States was a 12-gun brigantine that served in the Continental Navy from 1777 to 1780.

Baltimore was built in Baltimore, Maryland in 1777. She was fitted out by the orders of the Marine Committee of the Continental Congress as a packet or despatch vessel and commissioned in the Continental Navy under the command of Captain Thomas Read.

Few details of Baltimores service are available. In addition to performing despatch service, she is said to have participated in the defense of the Chesapeake Bay and Delaware Bay in 1778 and 1779.

Baltimore was reported lost off Cape Henry, Virginia, on 29 January 1780.

References
 

Ships of the Continental Navy
Age of Sail ships of the United States
Ships built in Baltimore
1777 ships